Vladimir Evgenievich Malevsky (November 1, 1925, Leningrad, USSR - October 17, 1981, Leningrad, USSR) was a Soviet Russian painter and graphic artist, a member of the Leningrad Union of Soviet Artists, who lived and worked in Leningrad. Vladimir Malevsky regard as one of representatives of the Leningrad school of painting.

Biography 
Vladimir Malevsky was born on 1 November 1925 in Leningrad. He suffered in the Blokade winter of 1941 in Leningrad. In Murch of 1942 he was evacuated to Arkhangelsk and in 1943 he was draft to the Red Army. In February 1944 Vladimir Malevsky was hardly wounded and later he gave an early discharge from military service on medical grounds. Returning to Arkhangelsk, he became a student of an artist in the cinema "Edisson".
In 1946 Vladimir Malevsky returned to Leningrad with his mother Elisaveta Fedorovna Zinovjeva (1894-1958) and younger sister. His father Evgeny Vladimyrovich Malevsky dead in 1942.

In Leningrad in 1951 Malevsky graduated Tavricheskaya Art School and was accepted to Institute of Painting, Sculpture and Architecture where he studied of Alexander Zaytsev, Vasily Sokolov, Leonid Khudiakov. In 1957 he graduated it in the Boris Ioganson workshop with the rank of artist of painting. His degree work was a painting titled "At the construction site".

After finishing his study Vladimir Malevsky continued the employment in the Boris Ioganson workshop from 1958 till 1960. In 1957 Vladimir Malevsky was adopted in the Leningrad Union of Soviet Artists. Since 1957 Malevsky had participated in Art Exhibitions. He painted genre and historical painting, landscapes, cityscapes, still lifes. Among his works were "Peonies" (1958), "Summer Day" (1961), "The Year of 1905" (1967), «Lilac» (1972), «Bicyclists», «Regatta» (both 1980), and others.

Vladimir Evgenievich Malevsky died in Leningrad on October 17, 1981. His paintings reside in art museums and private collections in the Russia, France, in the U.S., Ukraine, Germany, England, and other countries.

See also

 Fine Art of Leningrad
 Leningrad School of Painting
 List of 20th-century Russian painters
 List of painters of Saint Petersburg Union of Artists
 Saint Petersburg Union of Artists

References

Sources 
 Центральный Государственный Архив литературы и искусства. СПб. Ф.78. Оп.5. Д.124.
 Всесоюзная художественная выставка, посвящённая 40-летию Великой Октябрьской социалистической революции. Каталог. М., Советский художник, 1957. С.46.
 Выставка произведений ленинградских художников 1961 года. Каталог. Л., Художник РСФСР, 1964. С.26.
 Натюрморт. Выставка произведений ленинградских художников 1973 года. Л., Художник РСФСР, 1973. С.10.
 Изобразительное искусство Ленинграда. Каталог выставки. Л., Художник РСФСР, 1976. C.23.
 Справочник членов Ленинградской организации Союза художников РСФСР. Л., Художник РСФСР, 1980. С.73.
 Зональная выставка произведений ленинградских художников 1980 года. Каталог. Л., Художник РСФСР, 1983. C.16-17.
 Ленинградские художники. Живопись 1950—1980 годов. Каталог. СПб., 1994. С.3.
 Натюрморт в живописи 1940—1990 годов. Ленинградская школа. Каталог выставки. СПб., 1997. С.3.
 Связь времен. 1932—1997. Художники — члены Санкт — Петербургского Союза художников России. Каталог выставки. СПб., 1997. С.292.
 Matthew Cullerne Bown. A Dictionary of Twentieth Century Russian And Soviet Painters. 1900 — 1980s. London, Izomar Limited, 1998.
 Юбилейный Справочник выпускников Санкт-Петербургского академического института живописи, скульптуры и архитектуры имени И. Е. Репина Российской Академии художеств. 1915—2005.'' СПб., Первоцвет, 2007. С.79.

1925 births
Soviet military personnel of World War II
Repin Institute of Arts alumni
20th-century Russian painters
Russian male painters
Soviet painters
Socialist realist artists
Leningrad School artists
Members of the Leningrad Union of Artists
1981 deaths
20th-century Russian male artists